Heartsnatcher is a 1953 novel by the French writer Boris Vian. It tells the story of a psychoanalyst who is newly arrived in a very superstitious village where absurd events occur. The heartsnatcher of the title of this book was first seen in an earlier Vian novel Froth on the daydream. It is a macabre invention, an implement with which that traditional seat of our emotions can be gorily extracted. One victim of it is a philosopher named Jean-Sol Partre.

Reception
The book was reviewed in Publishers Weekly in 2003: "Vian's sharp, playful humor makes for an entertaining read, although there are extended flat stretches. While the allegorical conceits may be something of an acquired taste, Vian's prose is surprisingly accessible, and his fascinating take on the strange logic of human cruelty and inconsistency makes this a worthwhile read."

Adaptation

 film

See also
 1953 in literature
 20th-century French literature

References

1953 French novels
Novels by Boris Vian
French novels adapted into films
H